Authorpe is a village and civil parish in the East Lindsey district of north-west of Lincolnshire, England.

Authorpe is mentioned in the 1086 Domesday Book as "Agetorp", in the South Riding of Lindsey Hundred of Louthesk. In 1066 Godric was Lord of the Manor, by 1086 transferred to Ansgot of Burwell, who was also Tenant-in-chief.

The former church of Saint Margaret was built of greenstone, dated from the 15th century and was restored in 1848. It was declared redundant by the Diocese of Lincoln in July 1980, and demolished in 1982. Authorpe Hall Farm is a Grade II listed building built of red brick, dating from the 16th century with 18th-century additions, and 19th-century alterations.

Authorpe railway station served the village between 1848 and 1964. Authorpe Hedgehog Care Centre is in the village.

References

External links

Villages in Lincolnshire
Civil parishes in Lincolnshire
East Lindsey District